Vendychany is an urban-type settlement in Mohyliv-Podilskyi Raion of Vinnytsia Oblast in Ukraine. Vendychany hosts the administration of Vendychany settlement hromada, one of the hromadas of Ukraine. Population:

Economy

Transportation
Vendychany railway station is on the railway which connects Zhmerynka with Mohyliv-Podilskyi and crosses into Moldova. There is infrequent passenger traffic.

The settlement is on Highway M21 which connects [Mohyliv-Podilskyi and Zhytomyr via Vinnytsia.

References

Urban-type settlements in Mohyliv-Podilskyi Raion